Oxyna superflava is a species of fruit fly in the family Tephritidae.

Distribution
Egypt.

References

Tephritinae
Insects described in 1974
Diptera of Africa